This is a list of schools in Gaston County, North Carolina, United States.

Public schools

High schools (9-12) 
 Ashbrook High School, Gastonia 
 Bessemer City High School, Bessemer City
 Cherryville High School, Cherryville
 East Gaston High School, Mount Holly
 Forestview High School, Gastonia
 Highland School of Technology, Gastonia (magnet)
 Hunter Huss High School, Gastonia
 Gaston Early College High School, Dallas (magnet)
 Gaston Early College of Medical Sciences High School, Dallas
 North Gaston High School, Dallas
 South Point High School, Belmont
 Stuart W. Cramer High School, Belmont

Middle schools (6-8) 
 Belmont Middle School, Belmont
 Bessemer City Middle School, Bessemer City
 Cramerton Middle School, Cramerton
 Holbrook Middle School, Lowell
 John Chavis Middle School, Cherryville
 Mount Holly Middle School, Mount Holly
 Southwest Middle School, Gastonia
 Stanley Middle School, Stanley
 W. C. Friday Middle School, Dallas
 W. P. Grier Middle School, Gastonia
 York Chester Middle School, Gastonia

Elementary schools 
 Belmont Central School
 Bessemer City Central Elementary School
 Bessemer City Primary School
 Brookside Elementary School
 Carr Elementary School
 Catawba Heights Elementary School
 Chapel Grove Elementary School
 Cherryville Elementary School
 Costner Elementary School
 Dr. Edward D. Sadler Elementary School
 Forest Heights Elementary School
 Gardner Park Elementary School
 H. H. Beam Elementary School
 Hawks Nest Intermediate School
 Kiser Elementary School
 Lingerfeldt Elementary School
 Lowell Elementary School
 McAdenville Elementary School
 New Hope Elementary School
 North Belmont Elementary School
 Page Primary School
 Pinewood Elementary School
 Pleasant Ridge Elementary School
 Rankin Elementary School
 Rhyne Elementary School
 Robinson Elementary School
 Sherwood Elementary School
 Springfield Primary School
 Tryon Elementary School
 W. A. Bess Elementary School
 W. B. Beam Intermediate School
 Woodhill Elementary School

Alternative schools 
 Warlick Alternative School (behavioral)
 Webb St. School (disabilities)

Charter schools 
 Piedmont Community Charter School
Censorship by school administrators.

Private schools 
 Gaston Day School (Prek-12th grade)
 St. Michael Catholic School (prek-8th grade)

References

Gastonia, North Carolina
 
Gastonia